Henry Lennard, 12th Baron Dacre (Born Chevening, Kent 25 March 1570 – 8 August 1616) was an English baron and politician. He was the son of Margaret Fiennes, 11th Baroness Dacre and Sampson Lennard.

He was Member of Parliament for West Looe in 1597–1598. He successfully claimed the barony of Dacre on his mother's 1612.

He married, in 1589, Chrysogona Baker, daughter of Sir Richard Baker of Sissinghurst and Mary Gifford, by whom he had issue:.

Richard Lennard, 13th Baron Dacre (1596-1630)
Fynes, baptised at Sevenoaks on 27 December 1597
Edward, baptised at Chevening on 17 November 1611
Margaret Lennard, baptised at Sevenoaks on 27 October 1594, married Sir Annesley Wildgoose of Iridge Court, Salehurst in Sussex. He was born on 29 January 1590 and baptised on 5 February 1590 at St Margaret, Lee, Kent, England. He was knighted on 22 May 1605. According to Margaret’s epitaph, they had three children, none of whom survived her, nor had issue. Her son Henry Wildgoose was buried 7 January 1617 at Heathfield, Sussex, England. Sir Annesley’s parents John Wildgoose (later knighted on 23 July 1603) and Grace Annesely were married by settlement dated 21 May 1588. She was a daughter of Brian Annesley and Audrey Tirrell (d. 1591), a daughter of Robert Tirrell of Burbrooke. Brian Annesley was a gentleman pensioner of Queen Elizabeth, master of the harriers, and warden of the Fleet Prison. Her grandfather Nicolas Annesley (d. 1593) had been "sergeant of the cellar" to Queen Elizabeth. The surname also appears in the contemporary forms "Anslowe" or "Onslow" or "Ansley". His aunt was Cordell or Cordelia Annesley. The Annesley-Wildgoose case is thought to have been an inspiration for Shakespeare's King Lear, and the line "the wild geese fly that way" a play on the family name of Wildgoose.
Philadelphia Lennard, married Sir Thomas Parker and had issue.
Pembroke  Lennard, baptised at St. Helen’s, Bishopsgate on 5 July 1602, ("a fine gentlewoman"), married William, Lord Cobham and had issue.
Barbara Lennart, married Sir Philip Stapleton and had issue.

Like his father Lord Dacre lived extravagantly and was forced to sell some of his lands. He died of an infectious "ague" (fever) in August 1616. His wife had died a few weeks earlier, possibly from the same illness.

References

1570 births
1616 deaths
Members of the Parliament of England for West Looe
17th-century English nobility
English MPs 1597–1598
16th-century English nobility
12
People from Chevening, Kent